The Lowenstein House is a historic house in Memphis, Tennessee, U.S.. It was built circa 1890 for Elias Lowenstein, a German-born merchant. During World War I, it was used as a boarding house for women who worked. In the first half of the 1920s, Lowenstein's daughter, Celia Lowenstein Samelson, donated the house to The Nineteenth Century Club. It has been listed on the National Register of Historic Places since March 23, 1979.

References

Houses on the National Register of Historic Places in Tennessee
Italianate architecture in Tennessee
Queen Anne architecture in Tennessee
Houses completed in 1890
Houses in Memphis, Tennessee